The Stalinist execution list of July 26, 1938 was signed during the Great Purge of the Soviet Union by Joseph Stalin and Vyacheslav Molotov.

Notable people on list (in Russian alphabetical order)
1. Yakov Agranov, NKVD
2. Yakov Alksnis, Soviet Air Force Komandarm 2nd rank
3. Amatuni Vardapetyan, Communist Party of Armenia. Appeared as Amatuni Semenovich Amatuni.
4. Maksim Ammosov, First Secretary of the Communist Party of Kirghizia
5. Nikolay Antipov
6. Boris Ilyich Bazenkov, Komdiv
8. Frits Davidovich Bauzer
9. Alexander Bekzadyan, Communist Party of Armenia
10. Ivan Belov
11. , Soviet Air Force Komdiv
12. Walter Bergstrom, Naval Aviation Komdiv
14. Eduard Berzin
15. Yan Karlovich Berzin
20. Andrei Bubnov, former People's Commissar for Education
22. Anton Bulin, Army Commissar 2nd rank
27. Ioakim Vatsetis, Komandarm 2nd rank
29. Mikhail Velikanov
31. Mikhail Viktorov, Soviet Navy
33. Yan Gaylit, Soviet Red Army Komkor
37. Sergei Gribov
40. Ivan Gryaznov
41. Yakov Davydov
42. Terenty Deribas, NKVD
43. Ivan Naumovich Dubovoy, Komandarm 2nd rank
44. Pavel Dybenko, Komandarm 2nd rank
46. Alexander Ilyich Yegorov (name crossed out, spared)
47. Volodymyr Zatonsky
53. Grigory Kireyev, admiral
54. Vilhelm Knorin
58. Ivan Kosogov
60. Yepifan Kovtyukh, Komkor
61. Nikolai Krivoruchko
63. Nikolai Krylenko
64. Nikolay Kuibyshev
67. Dmitry Kuchinsky, divisional commander
70. Mikhail Levandovsky, Komandarm 2nd rank
80. Valery Mezhlauk
85. , corps commissar
86. Grigory Okunev, army commissar
87. Vladimir Mitrofanovich Orlov, Soviet Navy
96. Yakov Popok
98. Osip Piatnitsky
103. Moisei Rukhimovich
104. Yan Rudzutak
106. Mikhail Sangursky
107. Alexander Andreyevich Svechin
109. Alexander Sedyakin, Komandarm 2nd rank
110. Danilo Serdich, divisional commander
118. Aleksei Stetskii
119. , divisional commander
123. Ivan Tkachev
125. Józef Unszlicht
126. Semyon Uritsky, Komkor
127. Moisei Frumkin
129. Innokenty Khalepsky, Komandarm 2nd rank
132. Vasiliy Khripin
137. Boris Shumyatsky
139. Yakov Yakovlev

See also
Stalin's shooting lists

External links

Great Purge